{{DISPLAYTITLE:C5H9NO3S}}
The molecular formula C5H9NO3S (molar mass: 163.195 g/mol, exact mass: 163.0303 u) may refer to:

 Acetylcysteine, also known as N-acetylcysteine (NAC)
 Tiopronin